Khliehriat is the headquarters of the East Jaintia Hills district in Meghalaya state of India. The district was carved out of Jaintia Hills district.

Khliehriat and Saipung are the two community and rural development blocks of the district.

Khliehriat has a government hospital and a few private clinics. There are many churches in Khliehriat and people are Christians in majority. There are many schools namely Khliehriat Higher Secondary School with students from kindergarten to Science stream in Higher Secondary. Football and bull fighting are some of the major crowd attractions.

Khliehriat has a fairly cold temperature throughout the year, accompanied by heavy rains in the monsoons.

References

 
Cities and towns in East Jaintia Hills district